Anastasios "Tasos" Douvikas (born 2 August 1999) is a Greek professional footballer who plays as a forward for Eredivisie club Utrecht and the Greece national team.

Club career

Asteras Tripolis
Douvikas made his professional debut on 19 August 2017, in a 2–1 home loss against PAS Giannina, coming in as a substitute. On 26 October, he scored his first professional goal in a 2–1 home win against AO Chania Kissamikos in the 2017–18 Greek Cup. On 26 November, he scored in a 2–0 home win against Levadiakos, thus contributing to the team's third successive win. On 2 December, he scored in a comfortable 4–0 home win against Platanias, helping his team maintain its form.

On 18 December 2018, Douvikas scored in a 4–0 away win against Apollon Paralimnio in the 2018–19 Greek Cup, ending a lengthy drought.

Volos
On 10 August 2020, Douvikas signed with Volos on a free transfer. In his debut, he scored the opener in a 2–0 away win against Atromitos. On 5 October 2020, Douvikas scored a brace, sealing a 2–1 away win against Lamia. On 31 October 2020, he scored in the late stages of a home game against AEL, salvaging a point for his team with the final 1–1 draw. On 30 November 2020, Douvikas scored a goal and marked his team's comeback in a 3–3 away draw against Apollon Smyrnis, despite going down by three goals early in the second half.

On 17 January 2021, Douvikas scored with a nice volley in a 1–1 home draw against Lamia. The following week, he scored helping to 1–0 away win against PAS Giannina. His excellent goal scoring streak continued in the Greek Cup with goals in away matches against OFI and AEK Athens, before scoring in a 2–1 away win against OFI once again, this time for the league and a 2–0 home win against Apollon Smyrnis.

Utrecht
On 23 April 2021, Utrecht officially announced the signing of the talented striker on a four-year contract for a fee that exceeded €1,000,000. In his first statement as an Utrecht player, Douvikas expressed his happiness for the transfer and his eagerness to meet the fans. On 15 August 2021, Douvikas celebrated his first official goal wearing the Utrecht jersey and scored the 3–0 for his club in the first game of the Eredivisie where the hosts emphatically celebrated the victory with a 4–0 against Sparta Rotterdam. On 19 September 2021, he scored with a penalty kick in a 2–2 home draw game against RKC Waalwijk.
A week later he scored again with a penalty kick in a 5–1 home win against PEC Zwolle, a historical goal because he was Utrecht's No. 2,500 in Eredivisie. On 23 January 2022, Douvikas scored after four months for Utrecht, in a 3–0 away win match against Sparta Rotterdam for Eredivisie. The Greek striker last scored on 25 September and since then 28 goalless finals have followed in the league, when he opened the score after Sander van de Streek's assist. On 5 February 2022, he scored a brace after two assists from Mimoun Mahi, and gave an assist to Henk Veerman, helping Utrecht come back from a 2–0 deficit to win 3–2 at home against SC Cambuur. He was voted man of the match for his performance.

International career
On 24 March 2021, Douvikas was called up to the Greece senior team by coach John van 't Schip for the forthcoming 2022 FIFA World Cup qualifiers against Spain and Georgia. On 28 March 2021, he made his debut with the national team as a substitute in a friendly against Honduras.

Personal life
Douvikas family is from Argolis, in where Tasos grow up. His father, Giannis, is a former professional footballer, who also is a trainer.

Career statistics

Club

International
Scores and results list Greece's goal tally first, score column indicates score after each Douvikas goal.

Honours
Individual
Super League Greece Breakthrough of the Year: 2017–18
Volos Player of the Year: 2020–21
Super League Greece Team of the Year: 2020–21

References

External links

1999 births
Living people
Super League Greece players
Asteras Tripolis F.C. players
Volos N.F.C. players
Greece under-21 international footballers
Greece youth international footballers
Association football forwards
People from Argolis
Footballers from Athens
Greek footballers
Greece international footballers
FC Utrecht players